The 1980 British Gold Cup was a non-ranking snooker tournament, that was held between 24 and 28 February 1980 at the Assembly Rooms in Derby, England.

Main draw

Group 1

Group 2

Single frame play-off

Group 3

Group 4

Semi-finals

Final

Qualifying

Group 1

Group 2

Group 3

Group 4

References

British Open (snooker)
British Gold Cup
British Gold Cup
British Gold Cup